The 2021 Clare Senior Football Championship will be the 124th staging of the Clare Senior Football Championship since its establishment by the Clare County Board in 1887.

The 2020 champions, and holders of the Jack Daly Cup are Kilmurry-Ibrickane who won their sixteenth overall title after defeating Cratloe in a repeat of the 2016 final, also won by Kilmurry-Ibrickane.

In 2020 a decision was made to not relegate any team from any championship in Clare due to the Coronavirus Pandemic. As a result, there will be two teams relegated from senior level down to intermediate for 2022 in order to revert to the preferred twelve-team championship format.

Senior Championship Fixtures

Group stage
 One group of five and two groups of four.
 2020 semi-finalists are seeded and kept separate.
 Each team plays all the other teams in their group once. Two points are awarded for a win and one for a draw.
 The top three teams from Group A and the top two teams from Groups B and C advance to Quarter-Finals
 The third-placed teams from Groups B and C advance to ‘’Preliminary Quarter-Final’’
 The three bottom-placed teams in each group contest Relegation Playoffs

Group A

Group B

Group C

Preliminary Quarter-Final
 Played by two third-placed teams from Groups B and C

Quarter-finals
 Played by top two placed teams from Groups A-C, third-placed team from Group A, and winners of Preliminary Quarter-Final
 Losers move to Senior B Semi-Finals

Semi-finals

County Final

Other Fixtures

Relegation Playoffs 
 Played by the three bottom-placed teams from Groups A-C
 Losers of both Playoffs relegated to Intermediate for 2022

References

External links

Clare Senior Football Championship
Clare Senior Football Championship
Clare SFC